Thomas Lord (23 November 1755 – 13 January 1832) was an English professional cricketer who played first-class cricket from 1787 to 1802.  He made a brief comeback, playing in one further match in 1815. Overall, Lord made 90 known appearances in first-class cricket.  He was mostly associated with Middlesex and with Marylebone Cricket Club (MCC) as a ground staff bowler.

Lord is best remembered as the founder of Lord's Cricket Ground.

Early life
Lord was born in Thirsk, Yorkshire, in what is now the town museum.  His father was a Roman Catholic yeoman, who had his lands sequestered for supporting the Jacobite rising in 1745 and afterwards he had to work as a labourer. The Lord family later moved to Diss, Norfolk, where Thomas Lord was brought up. Once he was out of childhood, Lord moved to London and got a job as a bowler and general attendant at the White Conduit Club in Islington.

Career
Lord is known to have begun playing about 1780 but his first recorded game was on his "own ground", now referred to as Lord's Old Ground, at the current site of Dorset Square on 31 May 1787 when he played for Middlesex v. Essex.  Lord has never been given much credit as a player but the match records of the 1790s indicate that he was a very good bowler, although it is true that his opposition was not always of the highest standard.

In 1786 Thomas Lord was approached by George Finch, 9th Earl of Winchilsea, and Charles Lennox, 4th Duke of Richmond, who were the leading members of the White Conduit Club.  They wanted Lord to find a more private venue for their club and offered him a guarantee against any losses he might suffer. In May 1787, Lord acquired seven acres (28,000 m2) off Dorset Square and started his first ground.  White Conduit relocated there and soon afterwards formed, or merged into, the new Marylebone Cricket Club (MCC).

The lease on the first ground ended in 1810 and Lord obtained an eighty-year lease on two fields, the Brick and Great Fields at North Bank, St John's Wood. The second venue, now referred to as Lord's Middle Ground, was built by 1809 when the first games were played there by St John's Wood Cricket Club. This was later merged into MCC who relocated to the Middle Ground in 1811. In 1813 Parliament requisitioned the land for the Regent's Canal, which was cut through the site, thereby necessitating a further move.

Lord's third ground

Lord then moved his ground to the present site in St John's Wood, literally taking his turf with him.  It opened in 1814. Lord was not, however, making enough money and therefore obtained permission to develop part of the ground for housing, a move which would have left only 150 square yards of playing area.  To counter his plan, Lord was bought out for £5,000 by prominent MCC member William Ward, a noted batsman who was also a director of the Bank of England. Despite the change of ownership, the ground has continued to bear Lord's name.

Retirement

Lord remained in St John's Wood till 1830 when he retired to West Meon in Hampshire, where he died in 1832. His son, also Thomas Lord, and born in Marylebone on 27 December 1794, was also a first-class cricketer.

Thomas Lord is buried in the churchyard of St John's Church at West Meon. The village has a public house named after him and is just a few miles from Hambledon, home of the famous Hambledon Cricket Club.

References

External links

 
 MCC site

Further reading
 Harry Altham, A History of Cricket, Volume 1 (to 1914), George Allen & Unwin, 1926.
 Derek Birley, A Social History of English Cricket, Aurum, 1999.
 Rowland Bowen, Cricket: A History of its Growth and Development, Eyre & Spottiswoode, 1970.
 Samuel Britcher, A list of all the principal Matches of Cricket that have been played (1790 to 1805).
 G. B. Buckley, Fresh Light on 18th Century Cricket, Cotterell, 1935.
 H. T. Waghorn, The Dawn of Cricket, Electric Press, 1906.
 Arthur Haygarth, Scores & Biographies, Volume 1 (1744-1826), Lillywhite, 1862.
 John Major, More Than a Game: the story of cricket's early years, HarperCollins, 2007.
 Lord's 1787-1945 by Sir Pelham Warner .

1755 births
1832 deaths
Middlesex cricketers
English cricketers
English cricketers of 1787 to 1825
People from Thirsk
Marylebone Cricket Club cricketers
Hampshire cricketers
Non-international England cricketers
Epsom cricketers
Old Etonians cricketers
Lord's
London Cricket Club cricketers
Lord Yarmouth's XI cricketers
T. Mellish's XI cricketers
Sir H. Mann's XI cricketers
Middlesex and Marylebone Cricket Club cricketers